Inwood is a hamlet and census-designated place (CDP) in Nassau County, on Long Island, in New York, United States. The population was 9,792 at the 2010 census. It is considered part of Long Island's Five Towns area and is located within the Town of Hempstead.

History 
Inwood was first settled in 1600s. Like many other nearby communities, the area was known as Near Rockaway. A meeting was held by the Town of Hempstead on January 16, 1663, and during that meeting, the name of what is now Inwood was changed to North West Point (also spelled as Northwest Point), named after its geographic position in relation to the more central part of Far Rockaway, which it was then part of. It became the first area which was once known as Near Rockaway to be given its own name. Its original settlers were Jamaica Bay fishermen, generally lawless and troublesome to other Rockaway residents. Soon after the American Civil War, the area in 1871 became known as Westville. The Westville designation was used until residents petitioned for the United States Postal Service to establish a post office in the community. The post office refused as a Westville already existed upstate. This led locals to change the community's name to Inwood in December 1888. This name received the most votes; the other proposed names included Bayhead, Springhaven, Radwayton, Elco, Raway, Pike's Peak, and Custer. By changing the name, the locals were able to get a post office for Inwood, which opened on February 25, 1889.

The post office closed ca. 1920, and it was not until 1949 when a new post office would open in the community (although an unsuccessful attempt was made in 1932).

The first true road in the area, the Inwood end of Lord Avenue, was built when the neighboring village of Lawrence was developed.

When the first post office in the village was established on February 25, 1889, the name of the village was changed to Inwood; a post office named Westville already existed in New York State. By the time of World War I, a large part of Inwood's population was of Italian and Albanian extraction.

Inwood is home to the famous Inwood Country Club which was the site of the 1921 PGA Championship as well as the 1923 U.S. Open.

Geography

Inwood's northernmost and westernmost boundaries border Queens in the City of New York.

Inwood is bisected by the Nassau Expressway (New York State Route 878).

Demographics

2010 census 
As of the 2010 United States census, there were 9,792 people residing in the CDP. The racial makeup of the CDP was 48.02% White, 24.15% African American, 0.74% Native American, 3.31% Asian, 0.15% Pacific Islander, 19.21% from other races, and 4.42% from two or more races. Hispanic or Latino of any race were 42.79% of the population.

Census 2000 
As of the census of 2000, there were 9,325 people, 3,041 households, and 2,253 families residing in the CDP. The population density was 5,488.4 per square mile (2,117.9/km2). There were 3,132 housing units at an average density of 1,843.4/sq mi (711.3/km2). The racial makeup of the CDP was 53.25% White, 25.87% African American, 0.42% Native American, 2.04% Asian, 0.02% Pacific Islander, 13.01% from other races, and 5.39% from two or more races. Hispanic or Latino of any race were 26.32% of the population.

There were 3,041 households, out of which 37.2% had children under the age of 18 living with them, 47.2% were married couples living together, 21.1% had a female householder with no husband present, and 25.9% were non-families. 21.7% of all households were made up of individuals, and 12.1% had someone living alone who was 65 years of age or older. The average household size was 3.06 and the average family size was 3.55.

In the CDP, the population was spread out, with 27.8% under the age of 18, 8.7% from 18 to 24, 30.7% from 25 to 44, 19.7% from 45 to 64, and 13.1% who were 65 years of age or older. The median age was 34 years. For every 100 females, there were 88.5 males. For every 100 females age 18 and over, there were 83.0 males.

The median income for a household in the CDP was $41,334, and the median income for a family was $48,345. Males had a median income of $36,788 versus $28,482 for females. The per capita income for the CDP was $16,009. About 12.4% of families and 14.6% of the population were below the poverty line, including 18.4% of those under age 18 and 13.7% of those age 65 or over.

Government 
As Inwood is an unincorporated hamlet, it is governed by the Town of Hempstead. The hamlet is represented as part of the Town of Hempstead's 3rd District, which as of August 2022 is represented by Councilwoman Melissa Miller.

Parks and recreation 
Inwood has a park located on a bay with a launching pad into Mott's Basin. The park, which is operated by Nassau County, is called Inwood Park.

Education

Students attend Lawrence Public Schools, which also serves students from Lawrence, Cedarhurst, and Atlantic Beach, and sections of North Woodmere and Woodmere.

Infrastructure

Rail 
The Inwood station on Long Island Rail Road's Far Rockaway Branch is located towards the southern edge of the hamlet and provides service to Jamaica station with connections to Pennsylvania Station and Atlantic Terminal.

Bus 
Despite being in Nassau County, Inwood is not only served by Nassau Inter-County Express.

NICE runs buses on the area's far eastern border of Rockaway Turnpike where the n31 makes a few stops.

Unlike most Nassau County towns, the neighborhood is primarily serviced by the MTA with the Q113 and Q114 bus routes.

Road 
Inwood is served by the Nassau Expressway (NY 878) (which bisects the hamlet) and the Rockaway Turnpike.

Notable people 

 Ray Barbuti – Olympian.
 J. Russell Sprague – First County Executive of Nassau County.

References

Hempstead, New York
Five Towns
Census-designated places in New York (state)
Hamlets in New York (state)
Census-designated places in Nassau County, New York
Hamlets in Nassau County, New York